The Astoria Royal Chinooks, known also as the Lower Columbia Royal Chinooks, were a professional basketball team based in Astoria, Oregon who played in the Pacific Coast Professional Basketball League (PCBL) during the 1947–48 season. Wally Palmberg, a graduate of Oregon State University, was their player-coach and part-owner. At the start of February, 1948 the Royal Chinooks called a team meeting to announce that they were folding due to low attendance. All of their roster were declared free agents and most of them signed with other clubs. Their home court was Astoria Armory.

Roster
Bill Magruder, forward
Rube Wirkkunen, forward
Ken Hays, center from the University of Oregon
Jack Howard, guard
Jim Vernon, guard
Ty Lovelace, guard from Eugene High School
Wally Palmberg, guard and head coach from Oregon State University
Bob Warren, guard
Erland "Andy" Anderson, forward from Oregon State University
Frank Smith

References

Basketball teams established in 1947
Sports clubs disestablished in 1948
Defunct basketball teams in Oregon
1947 establishments in Oregon
1948 disestablishments in Oregon
Astoria, Oregon